The 1978 King's Cup finals were held in Bangkok. This edition once again reverted to two groups of 3 teams. The winners and runners up advance.

Thailand entered this edition with an 'A' and 'B' squads. Indonesia was represented by clubside Persib.

The Groups
Two groups of three teams.
Winners and runner up qualifies for the semi-finals.

Fixtures and results

Group A

Group B
Results unknown

Semi-finals

Singapore advanced, result unknown

Final

Winner

External links
RSSSF

King's Cup
Kings Cup, 1978
Kings Cup, 1978